SWD Powervolleys Düren is a German professional men's volleyball club which plays in the German Bundesliga. They play their home matches at the Arena Kreis in Düren.

Former names
 2001–2014: evivo Düren
 1965–2001: Dürener TV

References

External links
 Official website 
 Team profile at Volleybox.net

German volleyball clubs
Volleyball clubs established in 1965
1965 establishments in Germany